Vanguard Nunatak is a conspicuous cone-shaped nunatak (715 m) standing at the northern extremity of the Forrestal Range, Pensacola Mountains in Antarctica. It was mapped by United States Geological Survey (USGS) from surveys and U.S. Navy air photos, 1956–66, and was named by the Advisory Committee on Antarctic Names (US-ACAN) for its prominent position at the north end of the Forrestal Range.

 
Nunataks of Queen Elizabeth Land